The Dunlawton Avenue Historic District is a U.S. historic district (designated as such on February 5, 1998) located in Port Orange, Florida. The district runs roughly along Dunlawton Avenue to Lafayette Avenue, and Orange Avenue and Wellman Street. It contains 17 historic buildings.

Gallery

References

External links
 Volusia County listings at National Register of Historic Places

National Register of Historic Places in Volusia County, Florida
Historic districts on the National Register of Historic Places in Florida
Port Orange, Florida